Random Encounters (UK title A Random Encounter) is a 2013 American romantic-comedy film directed by Boris Undorf, written by Nate Barlow and starring Michael Rady, Meghan Markle, and Abby Wathen. The film was initially released on digital platforms in the United States December 1, 2013, and was  rereleased in the United Kingdom under its new title on DVD and digital platforms May 7, 2018.

Plot
Laura (Abby Wathen) is a down-on-her-luck actress whose love life is faring no better and Kevin (Michael Rady) is an up-and-coming screenwriter trapped in a dead-end relationship with ditzy Cyndy (Deja Kreutzberg).

After a particularly awful audition, Laura stops in a coffee shop to wait for a friend, and accidentally spills her drink over Kevin. She apologizes profusely, and they have a moment, but Kevin has to rush out to a big pitch meeting.

Laura's roommate and best friend, LA party girl Mindy (Meghan Markle), tries to help Laura with her love life, also to no avail.  After a few days, both Kevin and Laura's thoughts drift towards each other...but in a city the size of Los Angeles, can they ever find each other again?

Cast
Michael Rady as Kevin
Abby Wathen as Laura
Meghan Markle as Mindy
Joshua LeBar as Ted
Deja Kreutzberg as Cyndy
Sean Young as Terri Preston
Don Stark as Dr. Tim
Nate Barlow as Nate

Reception
The film has garnered a lot of attention in the UK due to Markle's marriage to Prince Harry.

References

External links
 

2013 films
2013 romantic comedy films
American romantic comedy films
2010s English-language films
2010s American films